Albert William Thomas Smith (born 22 April 1898) was a professional footballer, who played for Nunhead, Huddersfield Town and Bradford City. He was born in Camberwell, London.

References

1898 births
Year of death missing
Footballers from Camberwell
English footballers
Association football defenders
English Football League players
Huddersfield Town A.F.C. players
Bradford City A.F.C. players
Nunhead F.C. players